Whistling Cay is a  islet, situated  west of Mary Point on Saint John in the United States Virgin Islands. It is covered with trees and high cliffs in the north, where it reaches a  elevation. A gravel beach is located on the southeast side of the island.

Whistling Cay can be reached by boat or kayak from Cinnamon Bay, Maho Bay, or Francis Bay and it is a popular destination for scuba diving and snorkeling. During the 19th century, customs officials stationed on the islet would stop and inspect boats plying the passage between the British Virgin Islands and the then Danish Virgin Islands. It is located within the Virgin Islands National Park.

References 

Islands of the United States Virgin Islands